The 1948 United States Senate election in Michigan was held on November 2, 1948. Incumbent Republican U.S. Senator Homer S. Ferguson was re-elected to a second term in office over U.S. Representative Frank E. Hook.

General election

Candidates
Genora Dollinger
Homer S. Ferguson, incumbent U.S. Senator since 1943 (Republican)
Thomas A. Grove (Socialist Labor)
Frank E. Hook, U.S. Representative from the Upper Peninsula (Democratic)
Harold A. Lindahl (Prohibition)
Michael Magee (Socialist)

Results

See also 
 1948 United States Senate elections

References 

1948
Michigan
United States Senate